Valerie June Hockett (born January 10, 1982), known as Valerie June, is an American singer, songwriter, and multi-instrumentalist from Memphis, Tennessee, United States. Her sound encompasses a mixture of folk, blues, gospel, soul, country, Appalachian and bluegrass. She is signed to Fantasy Records, and its parent company, Concord Music Group worldwide.

Early life
Born in Jackson, Tennessee on January 10, 1982, June is the oldest of five children. As a child growing up in Humboldt, June was exposed to gospel music at her local church and R&B and soul music via her father, Emerson Hockett, who was also a part-time concert promoter. As a teenager, her first job was with her father, owner of Hockett Construction in West Tennessee, and a part-time promoter for gospel singers and Prince, K-Ci & JoJo, and Bobby Womack. She helped by hanging posters in town. Her father died in late 2016.

Musical career

2000–2009: Career beginnings 
June relocated to Memphis in 2000 and began recording and performing at the age of 19, initially with her then-husband Michael Joyner, in the duo Bella Sun. After her marriage ended, she began working as a solo artist, combining blues, gospel and Appalachian folk in a style that she describes as "organic moonshine roots music", and learning guitar, banjo, and lap-steel guitar. She became associated with the Memphis-based Broken String Collective.

In 2009 she was a featured artist on MTV's online series $5 Cover (following the lives of Memphis musicians attempting to make ends meet), and in 2010 she recorded the EP Valerie June and the Tennessee Express, a collaboration with Old Crow Medicine Show.

2010–2015: Pushin' Against a Stone and touring 
In 2011 she was honored by the Memphis and Shelby County Music Commission at the Emissaries of Memphis Music event. She raised funds to record an album with producer Craig Street via Kickstarter.com, raising $15,000 in 60 days. Later that year she relocated from Memphis to Williamsburg, Brooklyn. Shortly after, record producer Kevin Augunas introduced June to Dan Auerbach of The Black Keys, which led to the recording of June's album Pushin' Against a Stone in July 2011, which was co-written and produced by Dan Auerbach and Kevin Augunas.

In 2012, June performed with producer John Forté on a collaboration called Water Suites (on the hip-hop-blues song "Give Me Water"), and with Meshell Ndegeocello on the song "Be My Husband". She contributed The Wandering's 2012 album Go on Now, You Can't Stay Here: Mississippi Folk Music Volume III. In 2012 she performed in the United Kingdom for the first time, playing at Bestival and appearing on Later... with Jools Holland.

She has received substantial radio play in Europe on BBC Radio 6, including a feature on Cerys on 6 with Cerys Matthews. Mary Anne Hobbs of XFM has said of June: "This woman has already touched my heart, she really, really has."

In February 2013, June was invited to support Jake Bugg on the UK leg of his tour. In March 2013, June performed two nights at South By Southwest. The first performance was on March 14 as part of the Heartbreaker Banquet. On March 16, June performed again, this time as part of The Revival Tour.

After self-releasing three albums, her debut album as a signed artist, Pushin' Against a Stone, was released in the UK and Europe through Sunday Best Recordings on May 6, 2013, and through Concord Music Group in August 2013. The album includes several songs co-written with Dan Auerbach of The Black Keys, who co-produced it with Kevin Augunas. The album was so titled to commemorate the story of her life. June said: "I feel I've spent my life pushing against a stone. And the jobs I've had have been fitting for getting a true feel for how the traditional artists I loved came home after a hard day to sit on the porch and play tunes until bedtime." The record includes performances by Booker T. Jones, who co-wrote one of the songs contained on the album. The track "Workin' Woman Blues" was produced and engineered by Peter Sabák in Budapest. June has described the recording of the song as "magical" as it was completed in approximately 30 minutes. The two singles released in the UK and Europe were "Workin' Woman Blues" and "You Can't Be Told".

In 2014, June was nominated for a Blues Music Award in the 'Best New Artist Debut' category for Pushin' Against a Stone. June appeared on Austin City Limits in 2014.

2017: The Order of Time 
Rolling Stone listed June's second album, The Order of Time, as one of the 50 Best Albums of 2017, citing "her handsomely idiosyncratic brand of Americana, steeped deep in electric blues and old-time folk, gilded in country twang and gospel yearning....a blend of spacey hippie soul, blues and folk with June’s pinched, modern-Appalachian voice at the center".

In a 2017 interview, Bob Dylan was asked what artists he listened to and respected; June was among the artists he mentioned in reply.

2020–2021: The Moon and Stars: Prescriptions for Dreamers 
In 2020, June released a three-track digital release, Stay / Stay Meditation / You And I, songs she co-produced with Jack Splash. The songs were set to appear on her next studio album.

On January 22, 2021, June announced her album, The Moon and Stars: Prescriptions for Dreamers, which was accompanied with the release of a new single from the album, “Call Me A Fool” featuring Carla Thomas. The video for "Call Me A Fool" was released on YouTube. To support the upcoming album, June made several live appearances on shows such as CBS This Morning, Late Night with Seth Meyers and The Kelly Clarkson Show. In February 2021, June made her third appearance on KEXP, however, due to the COVID-19 pandemic, the performance was recorded from her home.

The Moon and Stars: Prescriptions for Dreamers was released on March 12, 2021, through Fantasy Records. The record was co-produced by Jack Splash and written by June. The album received critical acclaim, and was awarded a score of 85/100 on Metacritic, based on 10 critics' reviews. Pitchfork described the album as her "most heavy-hearted" and "far-reaching" record, and praised June for exploring themes of "love and loss" throughout the album.

In November 2021, June received a GRAMMY nomination for Best American Roots Song for “Call Me A Fool” featuring Carla Thomas.

Apple featured June's song "You And I" in their 2021 Christmas holiday ad.

Written work

Maps for the Modern World 
June completed a book that was released in April 2021 under her full name, Valerie June Hockett. Maps for the Modern World (Andrews McMeel) contains poems, artwork, as well as homilies that speak on ideas such as consciousness and mindfulness.

Discography

Albums

EPs

Singles

with Bella Sun
 No Crystal Stair (2004), Bella Sun Music

References

External links

 

1982 births
Living people
American folk singers
American blues singers
American soul singers
African-American banjoists
African-American guitarists
Songwriters from Tennessee
People from Jackson, Tennessee
People from Memphis, Tennessee
Guitarists from Tennessee
21st-century American women guitarists
21st-century American guitarists
Women banjoists
21st-century American singers
African-American women songwriters
21st-century African-American women singers